London Leah Tipton is a fictional character in Disney Channel's Suite Life franchise, which consists of The Suite Life of Zack & Cody, its spinoff, The Suite Life on Deck, and the made-for-TV Suite Life Movie. London has also appeared on cross-over episodes of other Disney series, such as Wizards of Waverly Place, That's So Raven and Hannah Montana and the special, Studio DC: Almost Live.

The character is portrayed by Brenda Song, who was offered the starring female role without an audition. While the character is a parody of socialite Paris Hilton, Song describes the character as being complex, and has stated London Tipton is her fantasy character. She is the daughter of Wilfred Tipton, the owner of the Tipton Hotel chain and the SS Tipton. Along with Dylan and Cole Sprouse, she has appeared in every episode of The Suite Life of Zack & Cody except for "Have a Nice Trip" and "Birdman of Boston", and every episode of The Suite Life on Deck.

Background
London Tipton is the only child of wealthy businessman Wilfred Tipton. Her mother, who has never been named or seen, is of Thai origin; her father is American, though he claims British citizenship for income tax purposes. She is heiress to the Tipton corporate empire (which includes the Tipton hotel chain and many other companies, including several record labels and a cruise line). It is revealed in The Suite Life on Deck episode "A London Carol" that London at one time loved helping people, and that every Christmas she volunteered at homeless shelters.

Despite being born into wealth and privilege, London had a very unhappy childhood; her father almost seems to have made a hobby of neglecting her, and remarried so many times that London never felt she had a mother. The Suite Life on Deck reveals that her father married a girl named Karina because London wanted her out of her way of her relationship with a magician on the ship. London herself says that Karina is her father's fourteenth wife. It is also said in the finale of The Suite Life of Zack & Cody that her father has been married a dozen times in the past, though in an episode on The Suite Life on Deck, she stated that he has been married eight times, though this is possibly due to London's ignorance and inability to do math. It is also revealed that London is illiterate, due to her lack of education and neglect.

Her father did not attend any of London's special events (not even Christmas) because he was supposedly busy, as revealed by London to Maddie in the episode "Lip Synchin' in the Rain." As she grew older, she filled the void created by her father's absence with shopping, as Maddie discovers in the episode "Kisses & Basketball". Maddie claims that London buys clothes to cope with feelings of emptiness. In The Suite Life on Deck episode "The Beauty and the Fleeced", London admits to shopping when she is depressed.

In the episode "The Prince & the Plunger", Moseby convinces London to attend the father-daughter dance with Mr. Tipton, though London is convinced her father will not come. After Moseby gets the hotel in perfect condition and hires a band to welcome his boss, he learns that Mr. Tipton is a no-show, as London predicted. Moseby discovers London crying in the linen closet; her tough attitude about her father once again disappointing her is revealed to be a front. Moseby asks London if she would like him to be her escort to the dance, and she agrees.

At the age of 15, she met Maddie Fitzpatrick, who eventually becomes her best friend. At one point, London enrolled at Maddie's Catholic school, Our Lady of Perpetual Sorrow. Later on in the series, London was expelled because she did not attend her classes, so she is forced to go to Cheevers High School (where she also tends to skip classes). Then her father has her attend Seven Seas High, a high school program on the SS Tipton, because on a ship, she will not be able to run away.

Biography

The Suite Life of Zack & Cody
London is a very spoiled, selfish, rich teenager with her own private suite at the Tipton Hotel in Boston, complete with floors full of closets (each with its own obsequious talking mirror), and a kitchen that takes up most of the floor. Her best friend is Maddie Fitzpatrick, whom London is essentially bribing to spend time with her. She is also very good friends with Zack and Cody. Though London can often be seen as a superficial snob who looks down on lower-class people, she does make exceptions for those whom she really cares about and has been shown to be loyal to her friends. She loves fashion, and states that she has been wearing designer outfits since she was a baby, and usually never wears the same outfit twice. She has a Pomeranian named Ivana Tipton who is treated like royalty. Since London has no nanny, or any adult to look out for her, she often looks to the Tipton employees for help and/or guidance. She dislikes her stepmothers and talks to Mr. Moseby, Maddie, and sometimes Carey about her problems. When happy, London tends to clap her hands repeatedly and jump up and down while saying her catchphrase, "Yay me!" Though it seems like London may lead the ultimate extravagant life, her childhood was far from perfect.

London has attended several private schools, but shows very little effort in her schoolwork. She transferred to the same private school as Maddie in the episode Forever Plaid, due to poor attendance at her old school ("And they even expect me to go on Fridays!"). In the episode First Day of High School, London transfers to Zack and Cody's public school, due to being expelled from all of the private schools she had previously attended. London's worst subject in school would probably be language arts, since she doesn't know how to read or write and often claims to have trouble with the alphabet. As stated earlier, London has below average intelligence. She is confused with many things, and is tricked by many characters such as Maddie and Nia. London, apparently, has some belief in certain mythological aspects; Maddie and Esteban once tricked her into doing many idiotic things by changing her horoscope. Though, annoying to some characters, London being gullible is found to be quite an advantage in difficult situations. It is also revealed in one episode that she must think before doing the smallest everyday actions. For example, she was walking through the lobby while thinking "left, right, blink, breathe" in the episode Super Twins. London's gullibility tends to get the better of herself and it gives others the impression that she's not very bright, as shown in an episode of The Suite Life on Deck when London gullibly believed to be in an actual relationship with herself, even sending herself "surprise" gifts and then actually being surprised when she receives them, up to the point when she wrote herself a break-up letter and was truly heartbroken when she re-opened and read it a few moments later.

Having such a glamorous lifestyle, London also has trouble with anything that involves hard work, which is something her dad encourages her to do sometimes (much to the dismay of London), usually because of her frivolous money spending. London's poor ability is often caused by her lack of effort and understanding, as it's normally easy for her to get her own way in life. Though sometimes she'll put her ego aside, and show she can do more than she's given credit for, which shows her to being occasionally smart and/or selfless. Though curiously, her stupidity seems to have increased during season 3.

London has her own web-show, ever since the episode "Tiptonline". The original producer of Yay Me, Starring London Tipton was Cody Martin. After Cody quit, due to crazy things London made him do on set, London's friend Chelsea Brimmer became the producer, but Chelsea left after one webshow because she was a horrible producer and the fans demanded they bring Cody back. London then realized how she needed Cody and apologized to him on the air. After Cody saw the show, he rushed to London's suite in the middle of the show and stated that he would return. However, whenever Cody was unavailable, Maddie often filled in as a substitute, and soon became the official producer. London continues to do her webshow on the SS Tipton, with Woody Fink as her producer.

She sees her father in person only rarely, but she often talks to him on the telephone. London says that Mr. Moseby appears many more times in her family's photo albums than Mr. Tipton or any of his ex-wives.

Although she is not of Jewish descent, London observes Hanukkah. In "Big Hair & Baseball", while she and Carey swoon as the New York Yankees check into the Tipton, she says of the players, "They're even cuter than that hockey team Daddy bought me for Hanukkah". In "Cookin' with Romeo and Juliet", London states that she's used to getting everything she wants on her birthday, Christmas, and Hanukkah. When Maddie points out that London shouldn't be able to celebrate Hanukkah since she isn't Jewish, London replies "And miss out on 8 days of presents? Not this Shiksa." Throughout the series, London peppers her speech with other Yiddish vernacular, such as "Oy Vey," "Plotz," and "Mazel Tov."

London hates to work out but has been shown to be very strong in several episodes. She is also tone deaf, but still likes to sing. It is revealed in "Super Twins" she is also easily hypnotized, which is also shown in The Suite Life on Deck.

The Suite Life on Deck
London journeys onto the SS Tipton with the belief that she is on a vacation, until she is informed otherwise by Mr. Moseby that it is for her to attend Seven Seas High (or as London refers to it, "stupid sea-school") so she can attend school properly without skipping class. London bitterly sees this as more as a punishment than an opportunity. When London finds out later that she has to share a cabin, she bribes her cabin-mate, Padma, with jewelry to leave in "The Suite Life Sets Sail", so she can have her own cabin. At the end of the episode, Bailey Pickett is revealed to be a girl, who prompts her to be assigned in London's half-vacant cabin. This pushes a stubborn London to escape the SS Tipton via helicopter to Parrot Island, after bribing an employee. Therefore, in the following episode, the ship makes a special journey to the island to rescue her, as she has been imprisoned because Tipton Industries cut down Parrot Island's trees, which made the native parrots immigrate to Seal Island close by. Later, she writes a check for $10 million to rehabilitate the island and resumes residence on the SS Tipton.

At the school, London is treated like a regular student. In order to skid her way through school, London has often tried to bribe the teacher (such as handing in a blank report with $100 bills on each page). However, she has been seen putting a little more effort into her schoolwork, and even states in the episode "Sea Monster Mash" that she enjoys having a feeling of accomplishment. In another episode Cody and Bailey use the placebo effect on her to help her work smarter in school and to their amazement she actually starts getting passing grades. London is also slightly smarter than what she was in The Suite Life of Zack & Cody, as seen in multiple episodes (though she still retains the ditzy demeanor). Also, despite her frequent attempts to escape the SS Tipton so she can resume her normal free life, London has found ways to adapt on the ship. Since London now has limited closet space in her cabin, it is mentioned that most of her clothes are carried by a submarine that follows the ship, though she continues to find more room, such as a yacht and a blimp, even once rented out a cabin under a fake name to use it as a closet.

London quickly establishes a tenuous friendship with Bailey. In Broke N' Yo-Yo, she moves Bailey to a cramped loft near the ceiling of the cabin, and Bailey retaliates by faking an attack of fictional "Sea Snarks", but eventually comes clean and they agree to share the cabin equally. London later reunites with Ivana, her dog, flown in by a helicopter in The Kidney of the Sea, and Cody referees an intelligence competition between her dog and Bailey's pet, Porkers the pig, but in the end Ivana and Porkers end in a draw. London occasionally mistreats Bailey, such as humiliating her using her webshow, "Yay Me" on a segment called "Boo You". Despite this, London means well as a friend and Bailey is willing to forgive her.

Although London admits that she doesn't "do things for other people", she has often attempted to do many generous things, with unfortunate results. In "Mom and Dad On Deck", she hoped to find Moseby the perfect gift for his birthday but resulted in her annoyingly following him everywhere in order to find out what he likes. She even tried to nurse Moseby after he got injured slipping on the sky deck, but only ends up making him feel crowded. In the same episode, it is revealed that it takes her half-an-hour to read one page in even the simplest books (she reads 'The Pokey Little Princess' to Moseby, and her problem is revealed). In the season two episode "Smarticle Particles", Bailey tricks London into doing well in school by giving her a "smart perfume" (as a placebo), to which London responds to as planned. However, London finds out later that the perfume is fake, and is upset that her 'smarticles' weren't real, and she states while crying that she can't be smart now, and that she likes "being smart" Bailey then cheers her up with a "smart lipstick", which London happily uses. This shows that London is actually very bright but lacks enough confidence to believe so. But other instances conclude that she doesn't know very much at all (e.g., in "Marriage 101", when she's mentioned the number of her father's marriages she holds up six fingers, though clearly saying "eight"). In "Family Thais", the gang travels to Thailand, where London meets her grandmother, and at first is upset, and disgusted after finding out that she was a farmer. In "Lost at Sea", London pretends to go insane and that she's on an island resort in order not to have to do any work. After they finally escape the island in a balloon made out of her clothes and fly back to the SS Tipton, she reveals her deception and makes Cody and Bailey acknowledge she's a lot smarter than they give her credit for. She is also seen to be precise with her hands, such as when she repaired a small boat with various eyebrow care products in "Cruisin' for a Bruisin'".

In the season three episode "Silent Treatment", after Bailey is ready to go onto the Sky Deck carrying a cat in a dress, London snaps Bailey out of her depression after her breakup with Cody by calling Bailey young, smart and pretty, which she responds to in shock. In "My Oh Maya", London pretends to be Zack's ex-girlfriend to help him get a girl and pretends to be Marcus' wife to get Dante (Marcus' identity thief) off the ship. It isn't revealed whether or not she did it for free but it can be assumed that because she is maturing she did it without cost. Since then she has been displaying continuous signs of attraction towards Zack. In the last episode, it was shown she would miss Mr. Moseby, since he was the one that raised her.

London Tipton's last line in the series is "Little me, off to Paris", in a French accent, apparently trying to sound rich, smart, and sophisticated. This line mirrored her line in the original series "Little me, back from Paris".

Family
Yolanda (unseen) - One of London's former stepsisters. In "Poor Little Rich Girl", London called her on her cell phone, looking for a place to sleep. Yolanda refuses because London never helped her. London refers to her as 'sis'.
Khun Yai (played by Elizabeth Sung) - London's maternal grandmother, Wilfred Tipton's mother-in-law, and Mrs. Tipton's mother from Thailand. London visits her in the On Deck episode "Family Thais", where London is surprised to find out that her maternal grandmother is a poor rice farmer. London tries to connect with her maternal grandmother by giving Khun Yai a makeover and redesigning her hut with expensive furniture and appliances. However, Khun Yai is uncomfortable with all the luxuries, which confuses London. After talking with Bailey, London learns to accept her maternal grandmother's lifestyle and the two share a close bond unlike any relationship London has with the rest of her family. Khun Yai also has a pet elephant who she can understand well, similar to London's relationship with Ivana.
Rome Tipton (played by George Takei) - London's great-great-great-great-great-great-grandson, who has only appeared in "Starship Tipton".

Father
Wilfred Tipton (voiced by Bob Joles in The Suite Life of Zack & Cody; played by John Michael Higgins in The Suite Life on Deck) - The owner of the Tipton hotel, Khun Yai's son-in-law, and father to London. His face had never been shown until the third part of the Twister trilogy. He is most commonly seen surrounded by his bodyguards and usually only his hand is shown. In "Not so Suite 16", his body and legs were shown, but his face was hidden by a large birthday present. It is not clear how he became the owner of the Tipton, because London mentions many times that her father bought the hotel while, in a few episodes, it is said that Tipton's ancestors owned the hotel before he did. Wilfred rarely sees London in person. He often wishes for London to have a better work-ethic in school. He also hopes for her to learn the proper value of money; he often threatens to have her dis-inherited. His hand was once seen in the episode "Lip Synchin' in the Rain" in which he was wearing a diamond ring. Wilfred Tipton has a history of marrying much younger women without London's consent, most of whom do not last long. In fact, Mr. Moseby once mentioned that the warranty on at least two of the wedding gifts he had given to Mr. Tipton lasted longer than the marriages. In "Twister: Part 3", Mr. Tipton arrives on Kettlecorn to discuss providing financial aid for them after a tornado caused them damage. Later in the same episode he buys the Pickett's farm which he later returns to its rightful owners.

Mothers
Mrs. Tipton (unseen) - London's mother and Mr. Tipton's third ex-wife. Divorced from Mr. Tipton and remarried, she visited London's sweet sixteen party but remains unseen. According to London, she never stays in one place for long. Nothing more has been said about her. According to Mr. Moseby, she has extremely strong arms. In "Twister: Part 3", she was said to be Mr. Tipton's third wife.
Stepmother 1 (unseen) - Mr. Tipton's fourth ex-wife. She thought she and Mr. Tipton would be together for a long time.
Stepmother 2 (unseen) - Mr. Tipton's fifth ex-wife. She believed she and Mr. Tipton were soul mates. They were divorced and remarried.
Louise Tipton (Stepmother 3) (unseen) - Mr. Tipton's sixth ex-wife. She was with Mr. Tipton for the shortest time. She refers to London as "that kid" and London refers to her as "that woman". She was mentioned in "A London Carol", where London said she only hugged her once just to pick her pocket.
Stepmother 4 (unseen) - Mr. Tipton's seventh ex-wife.
Brandi Tipton (Stepmother 5) (played by T Lopez) - Mr. Tipton's eighth ex-wife seen in The Suite Life of Zack & Cody episode "What the Hey". She was Mr. Tipton's assistant. She comes to visit London, but they do not get along well. Over the course of the episode they become friendlier to each other. As pointed out by Mr. Moseby, Brandi, out of all the stepmothers, has been shown to have the most concern for London. She and Mr Tipton were remarried and redivorced. In "Mr. Tipton Comes To Visit", it is suggested that he has remarried when London says "All 12 of Daddy's wedding cakes have been that flavor (German Chocolate)".
Stepmother 6 (unseen) - Mr. Tipton's ninth ex-wife. Mr. Moseby revealed that he was the best man at their wedding in "Twister Part 3".
Stepmother 7 (unseen) - Mr. Tipton's tenth ex-wife. She was Mr. Tipton's assistant.
Stepmother 8 (unseen) - Mr. Tipton's eleventh ex-wife.
Stepmother 9 (unseen) - Mr. Tipton's twelfth ex-wife.
Stepmother 10 (unseen) - Mr. Tipton's thirteenth ex-wife. London refers to her as "Mommy #11".
Stepmother 11 (unseen) - Mr. Tipton's fourteenth ex-wife. London refers to her as "Mommy #12".
Stepmother 12 (unseen) - Mr. Tipton's fifteenth ex-wife.
Karina Tipton (Stepmother 13) (played by Briana Lane) - Mr. Tipton's sixteenth ex-wife. She appears in the episode "Ala-ka-scram!" on The Suite Life on Deck as the magician's assistant. London and Armando start dating, so London gets jealous of Karina and tells her dad to "get rid of her", but he marries her instead.
Stepmother 14 (unseen) - Mr. Tipton's seventeenth ex-wife.
Stepmother 15 (unseen) - Mr. Tipton's eighteenth ex-wife.
Stepmother 16 (unseen) - Mr. Tipton's nineteenth ex-wife.
Stepmother 17 (unseen) - Mr. Tipton's twentieth ex-wife.
Stepmother 18 (unseen) - Mr. Tipton's current wife.

Friendships
Marion Moseby (Phill Lewis) is almost like a father to London. He often gives London support and good advice, and it has been mentioned that he has taken care of London since she was very young. As London states, he is in her family album much more than her dad or any of his ex-wives. He helped London take her first steps across the lobby of the Tipton Hotel, and also taught her how to drive. The two have a very close bond.
Maddie Fitzpatrick (Ashley Tisdale) is London's best friend and they always hang out with each other. They are shown to have a very close bond, yet London is still not above putting down Maddie's taste in clothes and hair, often exaggerating just because of the difference on their economic status. London often refers to Maddie as "hideous hair Maddie", which Maddie doesn't enjoy. Maddie serves as London's conscience and voice of reason, but also sometimes takes advantage of her wealth and is shown to be sarcastic with London's intelligence.
Bailey Pickett (Debby Ryan) - London's close friend, introduced in The Suite Life on Deck. They both attend Seven Seas High and are cabin-mates. Though London did not like her at first (she did not want a cabin-mate), they have since become friends. A bone of contention is tales of Bailey's large family, which the parentally-ignored London often envies.
Zack and Cody Martin (Dylan and Cole Sprouse) London maintains a close friendship with the twins. Cody is her web caster and often helps her with difficult homework assignments, and London often gets mixed up in Zack's various schemes.
Woody Fink (Matthew Timmons) - Cody's cabin-mate in The Suite Life on Deck.
Marcus Little (Doc Shaw) - Zack's cabin-mate, former singing sensation, previously known as 'Lil' Little', who leaves the ship to star in a Broadway show in New York City.
Nia Moseby (Giovonnie Samuels) - Moseby's niece and Maddie's temporary replacement at the Tipton during season 3. She and London have an interesting friendship, in which Nia takes advantage of London's wealth and sometimes gets her involved in a few of her schemes, which London never seems to notice. London refers to her as 'Cranky Maddie'.
Ivana (voiced by Emma Stone) is London's pomeranian dog, who is treated like royalty. She is seen in an episode that she can contact London with her cellphone.
Chelsea Brimmer (Brittany Curran) is one of London's wealthy friends. She is just as air-headed as London. First seen in Miniature Golf, and a guest star and former producer on London's web-show, Yay Me. She visited London on the S.S. Tipton in the episode, Flowers and Chocolate of The Suite Life on Deck.
Tiffany (Alexa Nikolas) another one of London's friends. She is shallow, air-headed, and diet-prone. First seen in Miniature Golf.
Portia Tanenbaum (unseen) - A friend of London's who's mentioned many times. She has her own webshow similar to London and gave to charity on one occasion. They usually go on shopping trips to Paris. In the episode Cody Goes to Camp, London says that Portia's going to teach her how to drive. Mr. Moseby nixes this by mentioning that Portia drove her father's yacht into piers 10, 11 and 12. London defends this saying, "She was putting on sunscreen." When London searches the name 'Portia Tanenbaum' on the Internet, Cody tells London that she has more results than London. Then London decides to start her own web show called Yay Me! starring London Tipton!. It is apparent that London has fierce rivalry with Portia and considers her an enemy instead of a real friend.
Francesca Grubman (Georgina Rosso) - Seen in the episode Health and Fitness, is one of London's rich friends. She attends London's junior fashion show in the episode, and frequently insults London and Maddie. Georgina Rosso, who portrays Francesca, is the older sister of Rebecca and Camilla Rosso, the twins that portray Jessica and Janice.
Maya Bennett (Zoey Deutch) - Zack's ex-girlfriend.
Addison (Rachael Kathryn Bell) - Classmate in The Suite Life on Deck.
Arturo Vitali (Todd Sherry) - London's favorite fashion designer. Although mentioned frequently in the series (London is constantly wearing his clothes and accessories), he makes just one appearance, in The Suite Life on Deck Season 3 episode "Frozen."

Ivana

Ivana Priscilla Veronica Tipton-Fitzpatrick is a character on the Disney Channel sitcom The Suite Life of Zack & Cody and The Suite Life on Deck. She is voiced by Emma Stone and her Greek voice is provided by Sofia Tsaka in the episode "Crushed".

Ivana is the pet dog of The Tipton Hotel heiress London Tipton. She is a Pomeranian breed although Estaban calls her a Shih Tzu. She does not talk to the human characters, but communicates to Maddie's dog Scamp, who she had puppies with and married. However, Maddie Fitzpatrick herself treats Ivana as a real person in one episode when she takes care of Ivana for a day. In this case, she was given sub-titles and barked, unlike how she talks to Scamp (although Maddie reacted, it is unknown whether or not she was actually understood). There was a book about Ivana in one episode, called Ivana lives in a Hotel. London copied it from Maddie for a short story assignment and gets an 'A', and in the end it becomes apparent that Maddie spoke it from a book her mother used to read to her when she was little.

When Ivana has puppies with Maddie's dog Scamp, Maddie names her puppy Scruffy and London names hers Prince Percival Persimmon Du Loc. London looked down on Scamp, who had to stay at The Tipton Hotel because Maddie's house was being fumigated, and set Ivana up with a "fancy pants" White Pomeranian duke, named Lord Quorckeran, (whom Ivana wasn't fond of, despite what London thought), until Scamp showed up and whisked Ivana to suite 25. Esteban had been secretly feeding them, and stated "they are in love". When Moseby was showing the Ambassador to "his" suite, the dogs were found out. London eventually saw that Ivana was happy with Scamp.

They ended up having four puppies: Maddie's (Scruffy), London's (Prince Percival Percimmon Du Loc), Esteban's (Maria Consuela Margarita Fransesca DeCielo), and Moseby's unnamed puppy, it is unknown if Mr. Moseby's puppy is a boy or girl. Apparently Ivana is aware of London's lack of intellect, stating, when London thought she liked the Pomeranian Duke, "you also think one and one is four", although it isn't surprising that Ivana is smarter than London. In "Footlooser", Esteban said "She's making you give her Shih Tzu a shiatsu" even though Ivana is a Pomeranian. She is often seen in the first season, but not as much in the later seasons. In "Poor Little Rich Girl", Ivana is unseen but Zack and Cody said they took her to Doggy Day Care. Ivana returns in "The Kidney of the Sea" on The Suite Life on Deck being dropped in by a helicopter and helps clear Zack's name after being blamed for stealing the kidney of the sea. In the episode "The Defiant Ones", she is mentioned. It is possible that she was named after former Czech fashion model and businesswoman Ivana Trump.

Reception
The show's breakout character, London has garnered much media recognition, and Song's performance received widespread acclaim from critics and audiences. Song became a household name after The Suite Life of Zack & Cody debuted in 2005. In an April 2009 andPOP.com article, they stated that as London Tipton "Song is the One to Steal the Spotlight" on the Disney Channel. They said: "If you ever watched an episode of 'The Suite Life with Zack & Cody' you should realize that show is watchable because of one character: London Tipton. Brenda plays the ditzy spoiled hotel heiress London (yup, an allusion to Paris Hilton) and, if I could say so myself, she does quite an excellent job doing so." While commenting on Song, MSN's 2009 cover story of the series states, "Song is one of the main reasons why the "Suite Life" franchise remains one of the most successful and highly rated series in the Disney stable." In a 2009 article, People magazine described the character as a "melodramatic high-seas diva." AllMovie described Song as a "charming and appealing personality, even when playing a shallow airhead".

Legacy
In August 2006, Song won an Asian Excellence Award for "Outstanding Newcomer" because of her portrayal of London Tipton in the series. Song was also named the "Queen of Disney" by Cosmogirl Magazine due to her major contributions on the Disney Channel including her leading role in the Suite Life series. Song ranked ninth in Netscape's 2007 "Top 10 Beautiful Petites in Entertainment", was voted one of AOL's "Top 20 Tween (and Teen) Television Stars", and Maxim ranked Song as the "Top Female Television Actress" in the winter of 2008 for her breakout performance as London Tipton in The Suite Life on Deck. Song was also ranked #45 in AIM's "Top 100 Celebs Under 25" list. TV Guide listed Song in its 2008 list of "13 Hottest Young Stars to Watch" for her portrayal of London Tipton. Zap2it named London Tipton the "Most Stylish" character of 2008 and one of "TV & Movie Shopaholics".

References

External links
London Tipton's official site

The Suite Life series
Fictional Asian-American people
Fictional characters from Boston
Fictional socialites
Teenage characters in television
Television characters introduced in 2005
Cultural depictions of Paris Hilton
American female characters in television
Disney characters originating in television
Internet memes
Fictional Thai American people